Great Cressingham Fen is a  biological Site of Special Scientific Interest near Great Cressingham in Norfolk. It is part of the Norfolk Valley Fens Special Area of Conservation.

This calcareous spring-fed valley has a variety of vegetation types, ranging from dry unimproved grassland on high slopes to tall fen where the springs emerge at the valley bottom.  There is a diverse range of flora, including some uncommon species. Plants in the valley bottom include water mint and southern marsh orchid.

The site is private land with no public access.

References

Sites of Special Scientific Interest in Norfolk